Trinity School (also known as Trinity) is a highly selective independent, preparatory, co-educational day school for grades K–12 located in the Upper West Side neighborhood in the Manhattan borough of New York City, New York, United States, and a member of both the New York Interschool and the Ivy Preparatory School League. It is regarded as one of the most elite private high schools in the United States, sending over 40% of graduating students to the Ivy League and other top schools.

Founded in 1709 in the old Trinity Church at Broadway and Wall Street, the school is the fifth oldest in the United States and the oldest continually operational school in New York City.
It has a highly competitive admissions process. In 2011, The New York Times reported that the acceptance rate for Trinity's kindergarten was 2.4% and the high school's acceptance rate was comparable.

History
Trinity School traces its founding to 1709, when founder William Huddleston opened the school to teach poor children in the parish of Trinity Church. Huddleston obtained books and funding for the school from the Society for the Propagation of the Gospel in London. The school’s first classes met in Trinity Church at the head of Wall Street; the first schoolhouse was built on church grounds in 1749. The building burned down two months later and had to be rebuilt. Columbia University, then King's College, was founded in that building's first floor. The first Trinity students, boys and girls, in addition to religious instruction, also learned to write plainly and legibly and were taught enough arithmetic to prepare them for employment. These eighteenth-century Trinity students were almost invariably apprenticed to trades such as blacksmith, bookbinder, carpenter, cordwainer, mason, mariner, shoe binder, and tailor.

In 1789, Trinity's 56 boys and 30 girls were under the instruction of John Wood, clerk of St. Paul's Chapel at 29 John Street. Its tuition stood at seven dollars per quarter, in addition to a one guinea entrance fee. In 1838, Trinity closed admission to girls. Girls would not be readmitted until 1971. In 1889, Trinity School moved to 627 Madison Avenue (at 59th Street), and moved again a year later to 108 West 45th Street. In 1898, the trustees established the St. Agatha's School for Girls at 257 West 93rd Street as a sister school for Trinity. St. Agatha's eventually closed.

During its first two hundred years, Trinity moved many times as the population of both Manhattan and the School grew. The establishment, in the nineteenth century, of a public school system in New York meant that the role of the charity school had come to an end. English and classical learning became the rule as the school increased in size to as many as 250 students and as Trinity refashioned itself as a college preparatory school for boys. The curriculum was designed to meet the admissions standards of the leading colleges and universities of the time.

In 1895, Trinity moved to its current location at 91st Street between Amsterdam and Columbus Avenues in the Upper West Side of Manhattan. Trinity currently occupies seven connected buildings: 151 and 149 West 91st Street house the admissions, advancement, and business offices; 139 West 91st houses the Lower School; 121 West 91st Street houses the Lower School language labs, Middle School Science Labs, and the Morse Theater; 115 West 91st houses the Middle School and two gymnasia; and 101 West 91st houses the Upper School, the two swimming pools, and the John McEnroe '77 Tennis Courts (opened in 2012), and in 2017 the school opened a 65,000 square foot addition, adding new science labs, classrooms, and a new performing arts center.

Shortly before the completion of the new upper school building in 1968, Trinity severed its Episcopal ties with Trinity Church, and is now non-sectarian, thus receiving no endowment from the Church. The school does, however, retain an Episcopal priest who is paid by Trinity Church. The priest delivers weekly chapel services at the school, as well as the annual baccalaureate service held at Trinity Church each May.

Forbes Magazine named Trinity the country's best private school in 2010. In 2004, The Wall Street Journal ranked Trinity as third best at getting its students accepted to some of the country's most exclusive colleges.
Under the leadership of John Allman, Trinity has tried to address some of the class and elitism issues that plague the school given the shift from its origins, and continues to build on their decade-long attempts to address diversity.

Academics

The Lower and Middle School courseloads are highly structured, and ninth and tenth graders are offered limited flexibility in their courses. Juniors and seniors, however, are much freer to flexibly select electives and other such courses. English is the only subject mandated through four years in the Upper School. Math is mandated for three, and the lab sciences for two. There is a requirement for religion and Physical Education. Trinity is also notable for having a full Classics department, which is widely recognized as one of the strongest in the nation. Nearly 40% of the student body takes either Latin or Greek, while more than 60% take two languages.

Athletics

Trinity is a member of the Ivy Preparatory School League and the New York State Association of Independent Schools (NYSAIS)
The school competes in the New York State Association of Independent Schools Athletic Association (NYSAISAA). Championships in this league are used as qualifiers for overall state championships.

Girls' volleyball – 1997, 2012
Baseball – 2006
Basketball – 2007, 2009
Girls' soccer – 2009
Boys' cross country – 2016, 2017, 2018
Girls' cross country – 2019, 2021
Boys' soccer – 2017, 2018
Boys' Indoor track and field – 2018, 2022
Girls' Indoor track and field – 2020, 2022
Boys' Outdoor track and field – 2022
Boys' swimming – 2020
Girls' swimming – 2020

Performing arts
Trinity School has musical groups ranging from instrumental music – jazz groups, orchestras, and chamber ensembles – to vocal music – choruses, both accompanied and a cappella. Musical performances figure in all three divisions with concerts, assemblies, and chapel performances during the school day and in the evening.

The school also has dynamic dramatic art showings with performances ranging from plays to musicals, both as classes and as extra-curricular events.

A yearly Shakespeare play is student-directed by The Nicholas J.P. Kau '08 Shakespeare Appreciation Society

Previous plays have included Julius Caesar (2017), Much Ado About Nothing (2018), Romeo & Juliet (2019), and A Midsummer Night's Dream (2020).

Notable students

 Louis Ayres (1892), architect
 Bill Berkson, poet, critic and editor
 Jake Bernstein (journalist) (1987), Pulitzer Prize-winning investigative journalist and author
 Humphrey Bogart, actor
 William Gage Brady Jr. (1904), a chairman of National City Bank
 Alvin Bragg, attorney and politician
 Chip Brian (1989), CEO of Comtex News Network
 Nick Bruel (1983), author and illustrator
 Truman Capote, novelist and screenwriter
 Jim Carroll (1968), author, poet, autobiographer and punk musician
 Andrew Cohen, film director, journalist
 Reed Diamond (1985), actor
 Edward Downes, musicologist and radio quizmaster
 David Ebersman (1987), Former CFO of Genentech and Facebook
 Ansel Elgort, actor, DJ
 David Faber (1981), financial journalist on CNBC
 Jim Fixx (1949), bestselling author and evangelist of running
 Daniel Garodnick (1990), representative, New York City Council, 4th District
 Russell Gewirtz (1983), screenwriter, Inside Man
 Caroline Giuliani, filmmaker, writer, and daughter of Rudy Giuliani
 Ryu Goto (2006), violinist
 Frank S. Hackett, educator, founder of Riverdale Country Day School
 Larry Hagman (1949), actor; played J. R. Ewing on the soap opera Dallas
 April Haney (1987), actress
 Sophie B. Hawkins (1982), singer/songwriter
 Alan Ramsay Hawley (1882), early aviator
 Amy Helm, singer/songwriter
 Warren Hoge (1959), United Nations bureau chief, The New York Times
 Craig Kallman (1983), Chairman and CEO of Atlantic Records
 Lloyd Kaufman (1964), independent filmmaker and producer, founder of Troma Studios
 William P. Lauder (1978), Executive Chairman of Estée Lauder Companies
 Sir Michael Lindsay-Hogg, stage and television director, actor, writer
 Stacy London (1987), fashion consultant and co-host of TLC's What Not to Wear
 Yo Yo Ma, cellist
 Ian Maxtone-Graham (1977), TV writer and producer, The Simpsons
 John McEnroe (1977), professional tennis player and media personality
 Patrick McEnroe (1984), professional tennis player and sports commentator
 John Hine Mundy (1936), British American medievalist, professor at Columbia University
 James Murdoch, media
 Lachlan Murdoch, media
 Zak Penn (1986), screenwriter 
 Francis Lister Hawks Pott (1879), former president of St. John's University, Shanghai
 Aram Saroyan (1962), minimalist poet
 Eric Schneiderman (1972), former New York State Attorney General
 Eric Shawn (1975), television reporter
 Michael Shure (1984), TV political correspondent and host, The War Room with Michael Shure
 Ben Smith (journalist) (1995), Editor-in-chief of BuzzFeed
 Oliver Stone, film director
 Eric Trump (1995), businessman
 Katrina vanden Heuvel (1977), editor of The Nation
 Emily Warren (2011), singer and multi-platinum, Grammy winning songwriter
 Colson Whitehead (1987), Two time Pulitzer Prize-winning novelist and MacArthur Fellowship recipient
 Jeremy Wright (1990), Member of Parliament; Attorney General for England and Wales
 Charles Wuorinen (1956), composer
 Katharine Zaleski (1999), co-founder of PowerToFly 
 Daniel M. Ziff (1989), billionaire businessman, heir of Ziff Davis publishing
 Dirk Edward Ziff (1981), billionaire businessman, heir of Ziff Davis publishing

References

External links

Preparatory schools in New York City
Private K-12 schools in Manhattan
Educational institutions established in 1709
1709 establishments in the Province of New York
Upper West Side
Ivy Preparatory School League